Arch Deal (October 5, 1931 – March 13, 2020, aged 88) was an American newscaster with WFLA-TV in Tampa, Florida, having started in 1959. He was also the father of Tampa musician Karen Deal.

An avid skydiver, Deal had made more than 5,000 jumps by 2002. In 1975, his chute malfunctioned and he hit the ground at 120 mph. He suffered a broken neck, broken pelvis, and cracked ribs. In three months time, he returned to work at his WFLA-Ch. 8 job. He later worked at radio station WRBQ-FM 104.7 as a sky traffic reporter until 1992.<ref>St. Petersburg Times  August 11, 2002 Ex-anchor survives skydiving accident By John Balz</ref>

Personal life
In 1991, he became a father again, fathering a daughter.

In 2010, his 57-year-old daughter Karen died, having been in a coma for a month after choking at dinner.

Deal died on March 13, 2020, also after choking on food. He is survived by daughters, Diane and Michelle Deal and his son, Doug Deal.

Published work
 Corporate Fall Guy'' , 9780578086460 (2011)

References

1931 births
Place of birth missing
2020 deaths
Television anchors from Tampa, Florida
Deaths from choking